The following is a list of awards and nominations received by British actress Tilda Swinton. Throughout her career, Swinton has received several accolades, including one Academy Award, one BAFTA Award and a European Film Award, among others. Swinton began her career in several experimental films in the late 1980s. In 1991 she won the Volpi Cup for Best Actress at the Venice Film Festival for her work in the romantic drama Edward II. She next starred as the titular role in Sally Potter's Orlando for which she was nominated for the European Film Award for Best Actress.

In 2001, she starred in the thriller film The Deep End, role that many consider her "breakout role" for American audiences, for her performance in the film she was nominated for the Golden Globe Award for Best Actress in a Motion Picture – Drama and the Independent Spirit Award for Best Female Lead. She was highly praised for her performance as the ruthless general counsel Karen Crowder in Michael Clayton (2007), role that earned her the Academy Award for Best Supporting Actress and the BAFTA Award for Best Actress in a Supporting Role, alongside Golden Globe and Screen Actors Guild Award nominations. In 2011, she received several awards and nominations for her performance as Eva Khatchadourian in Lynne Ramsay's We Need to Talk About Kevin, including a third Golden Globe nomination and winning the European Film Award for Best Actress.

For her influential career, she has received several special awards and honours, including the Richard Harris Award from the British Independent Film Awards in 2005, the British Film Institute Fellowship in 2020 and the Mary Pickford Award from the International Press Academy in 2020. Also, she has been honoured in prestigious film festivals, like the Venice Film Festival, where she received the Golden Lion Honorary Award in 2021 and the Berlin International Film Festival, where she has been honoured with two Teddy Awards, one as an individual Jury Prize in 1988 and a second one in 2008 as a Special Award shared with Keith Collins, Simon Fisher Turner, Isaac Julien and James Mackay for their contributions in keeping the legacy of English director Derek Jarman. In November 2022, she was presented with the 2022 FIAF Award "for her work on the preservation and promotion of archive film, film history and women's role in it".

Awards and nominations

Academy Awards

Berlin International Film Festival

BAFTA Awards

British Independent Film Awards

Critics' Choice Movie Awards

European Film Awards

Golden Globe Awards

Independent Spirit Awards

Satellite Awards

Saturn Awards

Screen Actors Guild Awards

Venice Film Festival

Critic awards

Miscellaneous awards

References

External links
 

Swinton, Tilda